Hitbox was a live-streaming esports video game website launched in October 2013. It was a competitor to Twitch. It was acquired by Azubu, and then became Smashcast.

History 
In November 2015 SeedInvest, along with Wargaming and North Base Media, funded Hitbox with investing $4,000,000 USD. CEO and co-founder Martin Klimscha was interviewed about Hitbox. He stated that their "goal at the moment is to build a superior live streaming platform", therefore taking on Twitch. He also stated that they wanted to improve the game streaming service by reducing latency. He said that Hitbox was to be more than the "streamer and the chatbox", and would "build interactivity into this live streaming experience.

Twitch's CEO Emmett Shear held an Ask me Anything (AMA) on Reddit in which he mentioned that Twitch would be implementing "muting of archived streams playing music that was not licensed in previously recorded Video On Demand". He said that Twitch would be "scanning for 'ambient music' being played in the background by streamers". Hitbox hoped to capitalize on this by not being as strict on video on demand.

In April 2016, Hitbox signed a two-year contract with ESL gaming, Dreamhack, and Wargaming. ESL and Wargaming only exclusively partnered with Twitch in the past. "Hitbox does offer revenue-share for non-partners and their service is slightly more South-African friendly."

Hitbox partnered with broadcasting company Nav-TV in South America.

A third party has released an app for the company on the Windows App Store. There is also an app for Android as well as IOS.

Hitbox planned to offer a 60 FPS, 4K resolution streaming service in late 2016. but this plan was canned with its merger and shutdown.

Hitbox had about 6 million monthly active users in its later months. They transitioned into using the HTML5 video player instead of the Flash Video player.

In November 2016 WarGaming among other investors invested $4 million US dollars into Hitbox.

On January 10, 2017, Hitbox announced through their blog that they were being acquired by Azubu.

On May 5, 2017, Hitbox shut down and their website was redirected to Smashcast, a new Live-stream service, which they claim is "spiced up with a new design & features and managed by a team consisting of Hitbox and Azubu staff".

References

Video game websites
Video game streaming services
Former video hosting services
Entertainment companies established in 2013
Internet properties established in 2013
Internet properties disestablished in 2017
Mass media companies established in 2013
Software companies established in 2013